The Eighteenth Amendment of the Constitution Act 1998  (previously bill no. 1 of 1998) is an amendment of the Constitution of Ireland which permitted the state to ratify the Treaty of Amsterdam. It was approved by referendum on 22 May 1998 and signed into law on the 3 June of the same year. The referendum was held on the same day as the referendum on Nineteenth Amendment, which related to approval of the Good Friday Agreement.

Background
The Amsterdam Treaty was signed on 2 October 1997 by the member states of the European Union, amending provisions of the Maastricht Treaty (which had been approved by the Eleventh Amendment in 1992) and the Rome Treaty (which had been approved by the Third Amendment in 1972). Following the Supreme Court decision of Crotty v. An Taoiseach (1987), a constitutional amendment was required before the state could ratify the Treaty. The Treaty of Amsterdam contained a number of optional protocols that member-states could activate at a later time after its adoption. The Eighteenth Amendment permitted the Republic to choose to exercise these options, provided it had the support of the Oireachtas (parliament).

Changes to the text
The following subsections were inserted after Article 29.4.4º:

The existing subsections 5º and 6º of Article 29.4 were renumbered as subsections 7º and 8º respectively.

Oireachtas debates
The Eighteenth Amendment was proposed by Minister for Foreign Affairs David Andrews on behalf of the Fianna Fáil–Progressive Democrats coalition government led by Taoiseach Bertie Ahern. It was also supported by Fine Gael, the Labour Party and Democratic Left, while it was opposed by the Green Party, Sinn Féin and the Socialist Party. It passed final stages in the Dáil on 26 March 1998. It passed final stages in the Seanad on and proceeded to a referendum on 22 May 1998.

Campaign
A Referendum Commission was established by Minister for the Environment and Local Government Noel Dempsey. This was the first referendum at which a Referendum Commission was established. It was chaired by former Chief Justice Thomas Finlay. At the time, its role included setting out the arguments for and against the proposal.

Result

Aftermath
The European Communities (Amendment) Act 1998 amended the European Communities Act 1972 to provide a statutory basis for decisions under the Amsterdam Treaty. The Treaty took effect across the European Union on 1 May 1999.

References

External links
Eighteenth Amendment of the Constitution Act 1998
European Communities (Amendment) Act 1998
Full text of the Constitution of Ireland

1998 in international relations
1998 in Irish law
1998 in Irish politics
1998 referendums
18
Ireland Amendments of the Constitution
Ireland and the European Union
18
Ireland, 18
May 1998 events in Europe
Amendment, 18